Sinch may refer to:

 Sinch (company), cloud based communications company based in Stockholm, Sweden
 Sinch (band), an American alternative rock band from Pennsylvania
 Sinch (album), third album from American alternative rock band Sinch

See also
 Cinch (disambiguation)
 Hyperbolic sine, a mathematical function abbreviated as sinh (pronounce "sinch")
 Sync (disambiguation)